Matei is a Romanian name. It is equivalent to the English name Matthew.

As a given name
Matei Balș, Romanian bacteriologist
Matei Basarab, Wallachian Voivode between 1632 and 1654
Matei Boilă, Romanian politician and priest
Matei Călinescu, Romanian literary critic and professor of comparative literature at Indiana University
Matei-Agathon Dan, Romanian politician
Matei Ghica, Prince of Wallachia between 1752 and 1753
Matei Millo, Moldavian and Romanian actor and playwright
Matei Pavel Haiducu, a Romanian secret agent who defected to France in 1981
Matei Vlădescu, Wallachian-born Romanian general

As a surname
Adrian Matei, Romanian figure skater
Adrian Matei, Romanian soccer manager
Alexandru Matei, Romanian water polo player
Cosmin Matei, Romanian soccer player
Cristian Matei, Romanian composer
Dan Matei, Romanian soccer player
Draga Olteanu Matei, Romanian actress
Florentin Matei, Romanian soccer player
Florin Matei, Romanian futsal player
Gabriel Matei, Romanian soccer player
Iana Matei, Romanian activist
Ilie Matei, Romanian wrestler
Ionuț Matei, Romanian soccer player
Marius Matei,  Romanian soccer player
Nicolae Matei, Romanian politician
Simona Matei, Romanian tennis player
Sorin Matei, retired Romanian high jumper
Valeriu Matei, Romanian writer and politician

Other uses
Matei, Bistrița-Năsăud, a commune in Bistrița-Năsăud County, Romania
Maței, a village in Scărișoara Commune, Alba County, Romania
Matei, an anonymous person referenced by Webdriver Torso

See also
Matthew (name)

Romanian masculine given names
Romanian-language surnames